Bikramjeet Singh (born 6 May 1993) is an Indian footballer who plays as a defender.

Career
After graduating from Paldi Football Academy, Bikramjeet Singh joined I-League developmental side Pailan Arrows for the 2011–12 season. For the 2012-13 season, he went out on loan to second division side DSK Shivajians, playing in the I-League 2nd Division.

Bharat
In December 2014, Bikramjeet joined newly founded I-League team Bharat FC.

International
Bikramjeet made his Indian U23 debut against Uzbekistan U23 on 27 March 2015 in a 2016 AFC U-23 qualifier in the Bangabandhu National Stadium in Bangladesh.

Career statistics

Club

Honours
Bhawanipore
Naihati Gold Cup: 2022
CFL Premier Division A runner-up: 2022

References

1993 births
Living people
Footballers from Hoshiarpur
I-League players
Association football defenders
Indian footballers
Indian Arrows players
People from Hoshiarpur district
DSK Shivajians FC players
Calcutta Football League players
Mohun Bagan AC players
Bharat FC players
Mohammedan SC (Kolkata) players
Indian Super League players
Mumbai City FC players